A referendum on political reform was held in Slovakia on 18 September 2010, following a successful petition started as a civil activity along with foundation of the radical neo-liberal Freedom and Solidarity (SaS), which later became the third-largest party in the National Council. 401,126 signatures were collected, with 386,000 found valid.

The referendum failed to meet the turnout threshold required under the Constitution of Slovakia, with only 22.8% of the electorate voting: far below the 50% required.  Large majorities voted in favour of all six proposals, with between 70% and 95% supporting each proposal.

Referendum
The referendum asked six questions, which had been promoted collectively by SaS as 'Referendum 2009' under their plan to hold such a referendum in 2009:
 to abolish the television licence (question 1);
 to limit parliamentary immunity (question 2);
 to lower the number of MPs from 150 to 100 by 2014 (question 3);
 to set a maximum price for limousines used by the government at €40,000 (question 4);
 to introduce electronic voting via the internet (question 5); and
 to change the Press Code by removing politicians' automatic right of reply (question 6).
The latter four demands had already been included in the new coalition agreement of the government formed after the 2010 election, which includes SaS.

Election
A turnout of 50% or more was required for the referendum to be valid.  Only one referendum in Slovak history has ever crossed this threshold: the 2003 vote on EU membership (51.5% turnout).

Results

External links
  Freedom and Solidarity's campaign website for the referendum

References

Referendum
Slovakia
Freedom and Solidarity
Referendums in Slovakia
Reform in Slovakia
September 2010 events in Europe